Justice Snell may refer to:

Bruce M. Snell, associate justice of the Iowa Supreme Court from 1961 to 1970
Bruce M. Snell Jr., associate justice of the Iowa Supreme Court from 1987 to 2001